For the 1980 Vuelta a España, the field consisted of 110 riders; 63 finished the race.

By rider

By nationality

References

1980 Vuelta a España
1980